Istanbul is the most populated metropolitan city of Turkey.

Istanbul may also refer to:

Arts, entertainment, and media

Films
 Istanbul (film), a 1957 American drama film by Joseph Pevney and starring Errol Flynn
 Istanbul, a 1985 Belgian film by Marc Didden

Literature
 Istanbul (novel), a novel in the Killmaster series
 Istanbul: Memories and the City, a memoir by Orhan Pamuk

Music
 "Istanbul" (Morrissey song) (2014)
 "Istanbul (Not Constantinople)", a swing-style song with lyrics by Jimmy Kennedy and music by Nat Simon
 "İstanbul", a 2016 instrumental track by REVen-G

Other uses in arts, entertainment, and media
 Istanbul (board game)
 Istanbul Agop Cymbals, a cymbal producer in Turkey
 Istanbul cymbals, brands of cymbals

Education
 Istanbul Technical University, an international technical university founded in 1773
 Istanbul University, a university in Turkey

Places
 Greater Istanbul
 Historic Areas of Istanbul
 Istanbul Province
 Istanbul Square, an urban feature in Lahore, Pakistan
 Istanbul Vilayet, a historical administrative division of Istanbul in the Ottoman Empire

Sports
 İstanbul Büyükşehir Belediyespor (football team), a football club owned by the Municipality of Istanbul
 İstanbul Büyükşehir Belediyesi (volleyball team), a volleyball club owned by the Municipality of Istanbul
 İstanbul Büyükşehir Belediyesi S.K., a multi-sports club of the metropolitan municipality of Istanbul
 Istanbul Cavaliers, an American football team in Turkey founded in 2005
 İstanbul Güngörenspor, a football club founded in 1983
 Istanbul Maltepespor, a football club founded in 1923
 İstanbul Ottomans, the first ever Turkish rugby union team established in 1999
 Istanbul Paten Kulübü, an ice hockey sports club established 1987
 İstanbul Teknik Üniversitesi B.K., a basketball team of the Istanbul Technical University

Transportation
 Canal Istanbul, a project of artificial sea-level waterway at the European part of Istanbul
 İstanbul Haydarpaşa Terminal, terminus railway station at the Asian part of Istanbul
 Istanbul Hezarfen Airfield, an airport for general aviation located in the  Çatalca district of Istanbul
 Istanbul LRT, a light metro system at the European part of Istanbul
 Istanbul Monorail, a projected monorail system in Istanbul
 Istanbul Metro, mass-transit underground railway network
 Istanbul Sirkeci Terminal, terminus railway station at the European part of Istanbul

Other uses
 Apostolic Vicariate of Istanbul, a Roman Catholic apostolic vicariate based in Istanbul, Turkey
 Armenian Catholic Archeparchy of Istanbul, also known as Armenian Catholic Archdiocese of Constantinople, serves Armenian Catholics in Turkey under the Armenian Catholic Patriarch of Cilicia
 Declaration of Istanbul, a declaration providing ethical guidelines for practice in organ donation and transplantation
 Istanbul Stock Exchange, a corporation in Turkey for securities exchange

See also
 Byzantium (disambiguation)
 Constantinople (disambiguation)
 Istanbul Airport (disambiguation)
 Istanbul bombings (disambiguation)
 Istanbul Summit (disambiguation)
 Treaty of İstanbul (disambiguation)